

Gelechioidea (from the type genus Gelechia, "keeping to the ground") is the superfamily of moths that contains the case-bearers, twirler moths, and relatives, also simply called curved-horn moths or gelechioid moths. It is a large and poorly understood '"micromoth" superfamily, constituting one of the basal lineages of the Ditrysia.

As of the 1990s, this superfamily was composed of about 1,425 genera and 16,250 species. It was estimated that only 25% of the species diversity of Gelechioidea had been described. If this estimate is accurate, Gelechioidea will be one of the largest superfamilies of Lepidoptera.

The name "curved-horn moths" refers to one of the few conspicuous features found in (almost) all Gelechioidea, and, at least in the more extreme developments, unique to them: the labial palps are well-developed (though not thickened), and form more or less gently curved protrusions whose end has a drawn-out, pointed tip. Their proboscis is generally well-developed, allowing for long-lived imagines (adults); the proximal part of the proboscis is scaly. Otherwise, the Gelechioidea vary extensively in habitus; most have small hind-wings with long, hairy fringes, though these are not easily seen in the living animal as they are tucked under the fore-wings at rest. The body is usually quite compressed, either dorsoventrally or laterally.

Families
The phylogeny and classification of the Gelechioidea remains a subject of considerable dispute. For example, the Elachistidae were at one time used as a sort of "wastebin taxon" to unite as subfamilies a variety of plesiomorphic members of this superfamily, which do not actually seem to form a monophyletic group. Many of these have now been moved to the Oecophoridae, but others are almost certainly likely families in their own right, while additional ones may well be so.

In 2011 the superfamily was divided into 21 families, based mainly on morphological studies, with adjustments made for some molecular studies. The number of genera and an estimate of the species number are given in parentheses.

 Autostichidae Le Marchand, 1947 (72 genera, 638 species) – includes Deocloninae, Glyphidocerinae, Holcopogoninae, Symmocinae and Metachandini, which have sometimes been treated as families.
 Batrachedridae Heinemann & Wocke, 1876 (10 genera, 99 species)
 Blastobasidae Meyrick, 1894 (24 genera, 377 species) – previously considered a subfamily of Coleophoridae.
 Chimabachidae Heinemann, 1870 (2 genera, 6 species)
 Coelopoetidae Hodges, 1978 (1 genus, 3 species)
 Coleophoridae Bruand, 1850 (case-bearers, case moths; 5 genera, 1,386 species) 
 Cosmopterigidae Heinemann & Wocke, 1876 (cosmet moths; 135 genera, 1,792 species)
 Elachistidae Bruand, 1850 (grass-miner moths; 161 genera, 3,201 species) – includes Agonoxeninae (palm moths) and Ethmiinae, which have sometimes been treated as families.
 Epimarptidae Meyrick, 1914 (1 genus, 4 species) – previously considered a subfamily of Batrachedridae.
 Gelechiidae Stainton, 1854 (twirler moths; 500 genera, 4,700 species)
 Lecithoceridae Le Marchand, 1947 (long-horned moths; 100 genera, 1,200 species)
 Lypusidae Herrich-Schäffer, 1857 (3 genera, 21 species) 
 Momphidae Herrich-Schäffer, 1857 (mompha moths; 6 genera, 115 species) – previously considered a subfamily of Coleophoridae.
 Oecophoridae Bruand, 1850 (concealer moths; 313 genera, 3,308 species)
 Peleopodidae Hodges, 1974 (7 genera, 28 species)
 Pterolonchidae Meyrick, 1918 (2 genera, 8 species) – previously considered a subfamily of Coleophoridae.
 Schistonoeidae Hodges, 1998 (scavenger moth; 1 genus, 1 species)
 Scythrididae Rebel, 1901 (flower moths; 30 genera, 669 species) – previously considered a subfamily of Xyloryctidae.
 Stathmopodidae Janse, 1917 (44 genera, 408 species) – previously considered a subfamily of Oecophoridae.
 Syringopaidae Hodges, 1998 (1 genus, 1 species) – previously considered a subfamily of Deoclonidae.
 Xyloryctidae Meyrick, 1890 (60 genera, 524 species)

However, a later phylogenetic analysis of the Gelechioidea, using a morphological and molecular dataset, proposed a revision into 16 families, with the status of two further families, Schistonoeidae and Epimarptidae, unclear.

 Autostichidae Le Marchand, 1947
 Autostichinae Le Marchand, 1947
 Deocloninae Hodges, 1999
 Glyphidocerinae Hodges, 1999
 Holcopogoninae Gozmány, 1967
 Oegoconiinae Leraut, 1992
 Symmocinae Gozmány, 1957
 Batrachedridae Heinemann & Wocke, 1876
 Blastobasidae Meyrick, 1894
 Blastobasinae Meyrick, 1894
 Holcocerinae Adamski, 1989
 Coleophoridae Bruand, 1850
 Cosmopterigidae Heinemann in Heinemann & Wocke, 1876
 Antequerinae Hodges, 1978
 Chrysopeleiinae Mosher, 1916
 Cosmopteriginae Heinemann and Wocke, 1876
 Scaeosophinae Meyrick, 1922
 Depressariidae Meyrick, 1883
 Acriinae Kuznetsov and Stekolnikov, 1984
 Aeolanthinae Kuznetsov and Stekolnikov, 1984
 Cryptolechiinae Meyrick, 1883
 Depressariinae Meyrick, 1883
 Ethmiinae Busck, 1909
 Hypercalliinae Leraut, 1993
 Hypertrophinae Fletcher, 1929
 Oditinae Lvovsky, 1996
 Peleopodinae Hodges, 1974
 Stenomatinae Meyrick, 1906
 Elachistidae Bruand, 1850 – substantially reduced with movement of five subfamilies to Depressariidae.
 Agonoxeninae Meyrick, 1926
 Elachistinae Bruand, 1850
 Parametriotinae Capuse, 1971

 Gelechiidae Stainton, 1854
 Anacampsinae Bruand, 1850
 Anomologinae Meyrick, 1926
 Apatetrinae Meyrick, 1947
 Dichomeridinae Hampson, 1918
 Gelechiinae Stainton, 1854
 Physoptilinae Meyrick, 1914
 Thiotrichinae Karsholt et al., 2013
 Lecithoceridae Le Marchand, 1947
 Ceuthomadarinae Gozmány, 1978
 Lecithocerinae Le Marchand, 1947
 Torodorinae Gozmány, 1978
 Lypusidae Herrich-Schäffer, 1857
 Chimabachinae Heinemann, 1870
 Lypusinae Herrich-Schäffer, 1857
 Momphidae Herrich-Schäffer, 1857
 Oecophoridae Bruand, 1850
 Oecophorinae Bruand, 1850
 Pleurotinae Toll, 1956
 Pterolonchidae Meyrick, 1918
 Coelopoetinae Hodges, 1978
 Pterolonchinae Meyrick, 1918
 Syringopainae Hodges, 1999
 Scythrididae Rebel, 1901
 Stathmopodidae Meyrick, 1913
 Xyloryctidae Meyrick, 1890

Footnotes

References
 See also associated Talk page for comparison of some approaches to gelechioid systematics and taxonomy.
  (1999): The Gelechioidea. In: : Handbuch der Zoologie/Handbook of Zoology (Volume IV – Arthropoda: Insecta. Part 35: Lepidoptera, Moths and Butterflies 1): 131–158. Walter de Gruyter, Berlin & New York. 
  (2002): Firefly Encyclopedia of Insects and Spiders. 
  (1994): The smaller moths of South-East Asia. Malaysian Nature Society, Kuala Lumpur.
  (2009): Gelechioidea. Version of 2009-APR-02. Retrieved 2010-APR-22.

External links
Global Framework for Gelechioidea

 
Lepidoptera superfamilies